"A Winter's Tale" is a song by Queen, from the album Made in Heaven, released in 1995 after Freddie Mercury's death in 1991. It was written after the Innuendo sessions, inspired as Mercury was staring out the windows of various places in Montreux. The song has a psychedelic, dreamy feel, and describes what Mercury saw outside the windows.

Composition and lyrics
Mercury wrote and composed the song, and also performed the vocals and keyboards (although the track is credited to Queen). According to May, Mercury wrote the song in a small house called "The Duck House" (seen on the album cover for Made in Heaven) in Montreux.
In the 1995 documentary Queen: Champions of the World, it was stated that this was, if not the first, then an extremely rare style of recording for Mercury, as it was all performed in one take live in the studio. It was stated in the film that Mercury had always insisted upon music being completed prior to the vocal arrangement beginning, but acknowledged that he had little time left and there was not enough time to work on it differently. The guitar solo was recorded at Brian May’s home studio years after Mercury’s passing.

Critical reception
British magazine Music Week gave "A Winter's Tale" three out of five, adding, "This is more ballsy and uplifting than the slightly corny Heaven For Everyone, but now the album is out, it may struggle to match its predecessor's number two success."

Music video
The music video, produced after his death, resembled the form of an epitaph, as Mercury's actual written song notes were displayed alongside imagery and clips of Mercury's past performances.

Track listings
CD single
 "A Winter's Tale" – 3:49
 "Thank God It's Christmas" – 4:18
 "Rock in Rio Blues" (Live in Rio, January 1985) – 4:34

Alternative CD single 
 "A Winter's Tale" – 3:49
 "Now I'm Here" – 4:13
 "You're My Best Friend" – 2:50
 "Somebody to Love" – 4:55

Personnel
Freddie Mercury – lead and backing vocals, keyboards
Brian May – electric guitar, guitar solos, backing vocals
Roger Taylor – drums, backing vocals
John Deacon – bass guitar

Charts

References

External links
 
 Lyrics at Queen official website

1995 singles
Queen (band) songs
British blues rock songs
Songs released posthumously
Parlophone singles
Rock ballads
Hollywood Records singles
1995 songs
1990s ballads
Songs written by Freddie Mercury